"Last of the Steam-Powered Trains" is a song by the English rock band the Kinks from their 1968 album The Kinks Are the Village Green Preservation Society. Written and sung by Ray Davies, the song was recorded in October1968 and was among the final tracks completed for the album. Variously described as a blues, R&B or rock number, the song describes a steam train that has outlived its usefulness and has since moved to a museum.

Recorded two months after steam trains were retired from passenger service in the UK, the song relates to Village Green themes of preservation and the reconciling of past and present. Davies based the song's distinctive guitar riff on the 1956 song "Smokestack Lightning" by American blues artist Howlin' Wolf, a song the Kinks and their contemporaries regularly covered. Commentators often regard the song as Davies's criticism of early British R&B groups for being inauthentic compared to the American blues artists who wrote many of the songs they recorded. Others consider the song as relating to Davies's feelings of disconnect from contemporary culture. The song became a regular in the band's 1969 and 1970 live set list.

Background and recording 

From 1967 to August1968, the Kinks recorded twelve songs for their upcoming album The Kinks Are the Village Green Preservation Society. Only a few weeks before the album's release, bandleader Ray Davies opted to halt production in order to expand its track listing. Recording took place in Pye Studio 2, one of two basement studios at Pye Records's London offices. Davies is credited as the song's producer, while Pye's in-house engineer Brian Humphries operated the four-track mixing console.

Davies composed "Last of the Steam-Powered Trains" on piano and recorded a demo of the song in 1968 on a reel-to-reel tape recorder in his home's living room. His initial composition differed from the finished song in several ways, featuring a slightly different riff, a throaty vocal and a jazz-oriented sound. The finishing recording is uncharacteristically live-sounding compared to the others on Village Green; to ensure his voice cut through the loud instrumental backing, Davies changed his original throaty vocal to a more nasally tone. Additionally, while every other track on the album runs under three minutes, "Last of the Steam-Powered Trains" is over four. After Davies created a mono reference mix, the band overdubbed a reprise, extending the song by nearly a minute. Davies further contributed harmonica, double tracked in places so he could play both lead and rhythm parts.

Composition

Music and lyrics 

Commentators variously describe "Last of the Steam-Powered Trains" as a blues, R&B or rock number. Davies based the song's distinctive guitar riff on that of "Smokestack Lightning", a 1956 blues song by Howlin' Wolf.  In the early1960s, "Smokestack Lightning" was commonly covered by British rhythm and blues groups, like the High Numbers (later the Who), the Yardbirds and Manfred Mann. The Kinks regularly included the song in their early live set lists but stopped playing it in the mid-1960s as the popularity of R&B began to diminish in the UK.

"Smokestack Lightning" features no chord changes but instead uses a single implied tonic, while Davies uses a progression. Musicologist Matthew Gelbart describes "Last of the Steam-Powered Trains" as having a twenty-four-bar structure that is "proportionally correct" in comparison to a standard twelve-bar blues.  Davies uses different chords at points, including replacing the usual final V–IV–I with III–IV. Band biographer Johnny Rogan describes the song as an "onomatopoeic exercise"; both harmonica and guitar play together to imitate the sound of a rolling train. The song speeds up as it proceeds, and near its end the band double their tempo for two bars.

The composition of "Last of the Steam-Powered Trains" coincided with a years-long reduction in the British railway network and the replacement of steam trains by diesel engines, a change which went into effect two months before the song's recording. Its lyrics describe a steam train that has outlived its usefulness and has since moved to a museum. Davies sings in the first person from the perspective of the train that he is the last renegade, while all of his friends are now grey-haired and middle class. He sarcastically sings that living in a museum means he is "okay", adding that "all this peaceful living is driving me insane".

Interpretation 

Commentators often regard the song as Davies's criticism of early British R&B groups for being inauthentic compared to the American blues artists who wrote many of the songs they recorded. English professor Barry J. Faulk thinks the song fits on Village Green by relating to the album's theme of "willful obsolescence", writing that by recalling the band's earlier R&B styling, the song serves to remind listeners that music can come to quickly sound dated. He adds that the lyrics are a celebration on Davies's part of "his own version of the fetishized past", while "the music suggests the ease with which the musical past can become a fetish". Rogan considers the song "a farewell to the past", but also relevant to the blues revival taking place in both the UK and US in 1968.

Academic Raphael Costambeys-Kempczynski considers the song one of Village Green various character studies. Miller writes that like other songs on the album, the song centres thematically around the notion of preservation and questions how one can reconcile both the past and present. He writes that like the character in Davies's song "Johnny Thunder", the train has avoided succumbing to middle class values like his friends but at the cost of living forever in a museum. Musicologist Allan F. Moore thinks the song is about the loneliness of its subject, who feels out of step with the current times. Band biographers Rob Jovanovic and Jon Savage each offer the same interpretation, but specify that the subject is either the Kinks or Davies, respectively. In a 1968 interview, Davies compared the song to "Do You Remember Walter?", explaining that both were "about not having anything in common with people", adding: "It's about me being the last of the renegades. All my friends are middle-class now. They've all stopped playing in clubs. They've all made money and have happy faces.

Release and reception 

"Last of the Steam-Powered Trains" appears on side one, between "Johnny Thunder" and "Big Sky". When the band held their first American tour in over four years in late1969, the song became a regular in their live set and was sometimes played as the opening number. The song featured in concerts in 1969 and 1970, often played as an extended jam.

Among contemporary reviewers, Robert Christgau of The Village Voice declared "Last of the Steam-Powered Trains" the most memorable track on Village Green and wrote that like many others songs on the album, it is about "how to deal with the past". Placing the song in the context of the rock and roll revival, he wrote it could have been the album's lead single had there been enough demand. In Paul Williams review of the album for Rolling Stone, he wrote that it made him smile to know the Kinks finally recorded "Smokestack Lightning", "and [did] a good job of it too". He continues: "A little fancy kineticism in the break, harmonica and bass and lead buildup, just so you know all the old tricks are as relevant to their music as any new tricks they might enjoy could be."

In a retrospective assessment, Morgan Enos of Billboard magazine describes the song as an "inspired goof", being a parody of bands like Them and the Yardbirds. Among band biographers, Clinton Heylin considers it one of the better songs on Village Green while also finding it disruptive to the album's conceptual cohesiveness. By contrast, Thomas M. Kitts writes that the song "now seems indispensable" to the album's concept. Rogan describes the song as one of the album's "great surprises" and considers it one of the band's best R&B numbers, and Christian Matijas-Mecca writes the song's expression of nostalgia anticipated the blues rock heard in the decade which followed.

Notes

References

Citations

Sources 

Books
 
 
 
 
 
 
 
 
 
 
 
 
 
 
 
 
 
 
 
 

Journal and magazine articles
 
 
 
 

Liner notes
 
 
 
 
 
 

1968 songs
Songs written by Ray Davies
The Kinks songs
Song recordings produced by Ray Davies
Songs about trains
Rhythm and blues songs
Blues songs
Rock songs